Sivaji is an Indian actor who appears in Telugu films. He won Nandi Award for Best Male Dubbing Artist for the movie Dil (voice for Nitin).

Career

Sivaji is from Narsarsopet in Guntur district. Sivaji started his stint as an editor in Gemini TV. He was offered a role in a TV serial and from then he started getting offers in Telugu movies. He acted in very small roles in notable films such as Kushi and Indra. Unlike his contemporaries he did have come from a cinema family. He dubbed for Nithiin in the latter's early career. He did many films as a second hero. Sivaji's first success as a solo hero came with the film Missamma (2003).

Politics

Ever since the movement for keeping the state united in Andhra Pradesh, Sivaji became vocal about the political issues. 
Despite being a member of the Bharatiya Janata Party (BJP) he started his fast unto death on granting a special status to Andhra Pradesh, 
which was a promise made by the erstwhile congress government at the time of bifurcation of the state. Initially he was against TDP and has been very vocal against its leader and Ex CM of Andhra Pradesh Nara Chandrababu Naidu but due to the Federal Government not taking any decisive steps for granting Andhra Pradesh Special Status. He started to support TDP and its leader Nara Chandrababu Naidu as he had been fighting for Special Status for AP. Now stopped fighting after formation of YCP Government in Andhra Pradesh. Currently he is involved in a scandal regarding TV9.

Filmography

Films
As Actor

As Dubbing artist

Web series

References

External links

Telugu male actors
Living people
Telugu comedians
20th-century Indian male actors
Male actors in Telugu cinema
Indian male film actors
Indian male voice actors
21st-century Indian male actors
Indian male comedians
1977 births